This is a list of the 22 principal areas of Wales giving their most recent date of creation and the style by which they are known.

The population and density are from the first results of the 2021 census from the Office for National Statistics.

* = Named as 'Caernarfonshire and Merionethshire' in legislation. Name changed by the council.

† = Named as 'Neath and Port Talbot' in legislation. Name changed by the council.

‡ = Named as 'Aberconwy and Colwyn' in legislation. Name changed by the council.

§ = Named as 'Cardiganshire' in legislation. Name changed by the council.

a = re-instated as a principal administrative authority after a gap

b = boundaries significantly altered in 1996 from its previous incarnation

See also
 List of Welsh areas by percentage of Welsh-speakers

References 

Principal areas of Wales
Principal areas